The cantons of Mamoudzou are administrative divisions of Mayotte, an overseas department and region of France. Since the French canton reorganisation which came into effect in March 2015, the city of Mamoudzou is subdivided into 3 cantons. Their seat is in Mamoudzou.

Cantons

References

Cantons of Mayotte